Beyond Bank is an Australian customer-owned bank operating in South Australia, Victoria, the Australian Capital Territory, Western Australia and New South Wales. It provides financial services to its members including savings and business accounts, term deposits, loans, insurance and financial planning, and has total assets under management of more than $5 billion. It is a certified B Corp.

History

 In March 2006, Community CPS Australia Ltd was formed in a merger between the Commonwealth Public Servants Credit Unions - CPS Credit Union (SA) Ltd and CPS Credit Union Co-operative (ACT) Ltd.
 In November 2008, Western Australian based United Credit Union Ltd and Westax merged with Community CPS and carried on business under the name United Community.
 In May 2009 the Polish Community Credit Union also merged with Community CPS.
 In January 2010 Hunter Region-based Companion Credit Union merged with Community CPS.
 In June 2011 Wagga Mutual Credit Union, based in the Riverina NSW, merged with Community CPS.
 In 2012 Community CPS was named Money Magazine's Credit Union of the Year 2012 and awarded the 2012 Mozo People's Choice Award for Best Credit Union.
 In August 2013 Community CPS became a mutual bank called Beyond Bank Australia.
 In April 2016 Country First Credit Union, based in Griffth, merged with Beyond Bank Australia.
 In May 2016 Beyond Bank Australia acquired Universal Financial Planning in the Hunter region.
 In June 2016 Beyond Bank Australia became a certified B Corp.
 In February 2018 My Credit Union, based in NSW, merged with Beyond Bank Australia.
 On 1 March 2020, Nexus Mutual (formerly Esso employees credit union), based in Melbourne, merged with Beyond Bank.
 On 1 April 2022, South West Mutual Credit Union, based in Warrnambool, merged with Beyond Bank, bringing their 13,000 customers.

Subsidiaries

Trading as Beyond Bank Australia Wealth Management and headquartered in Norwood, South Australia, Eastwoods Wealth Management Pty Ltd offers financial planning services as a subsidiary of the bank.

See also

 Banking in Australia

References

Banks of Australia
Banks established in 2013
Companies based in Adelaide
Mutual savings banks
Benefit corporations
B Lab-certified corporations in Australia